Jeremy Spencer Ross (born March 16, 1988) is a former American football wide receiver and return specialist. He was signed by the New England Patriots as an undrafted free agent in 2011. He played college football at California.

Ross has also been a member of the Indianapolis Colts, Green Bay Packers, Detroit Lions, Baltimore Ravens, Oakland Raiders, New York Jets, and Arizona Cardinals.

Professional career

New England Patriots
Ross signed with the New England Patriots on July 25, 2011, after going unselected in the 2011 NFL Draft. The Patriots released him on August 30 for final roster cuts before the start the regular season.

Indianapolis Colts
The Indianapolis Colts signed Ross to the practice squad on September 28, 2011. He was released by the Colts on August 31, 2012.

Green Bay Packers
The Green Bay Packers signed Ross to their practice squad on October 17, 2012. He was promoted to the team's active roster on December 1. He committed a crucial muff on a punt return in a playoff-game loss to the San Francisco 49ers on January 12, 2013, which resulted in a 49ers' touchdown.

Ross was released by the Packers on September 23, 2013, after committing a crucial fumble on a kickoff in the first quarter of the previous day's game, which led to a Cincinnati Bengals' touchdown. He played in eight regular-season games for the Packers over the past two seasons, averaged 17.9 yards on nine kickoff returns, 20.5 yards on six punt returns and made one catch for 8 yards.

Detroit Lions

Ross was signed to the practice squad of the Detroit Lions on October 7, 2013. He was promoted off the Lions' practice squad to the active roster on October 19, 2013, following an injury to wide receiver Nate Burleson.

Since signing, he has played a role as a slot receiver and kick returner. He contributed to the Lions' 40-10 Thanksgiving Day victory over his former team, the Green Bay Packers, on November 28, 2013.  In that game, he scored his first career NFL touchdown on a 5-yard pass from Matthew Stafford, and he had one run for 24 yards to pick up a first down.

Since signing off the practice squad he has recorded 5 receptions for 59 yards and 1 touchdown, 1 run for 24 yards, 8 punt returns for 159 yards, and 10 kickoff returns for 335 yards.

During a game against the Philadelphia Eagles on December 8, 2013, Ross scored touchdowns on both a punt return and a kickoff return. This made him the first Lions player to do so since Eddie Payton on December 17, 1977.

On April 20, 2015, the Detroit Lions signed Ross to an exclusive-rights free agent tender.

On September 5, 2015, Ross was among final roster cuts before the start of the 2015 season.

Baltimore Ravens
On September 7, 2015, Ross was signed to the Baltimore Ravens' practice squad. He was promoted to the active roster on October 10, 2015. On November 17, he was waived by the Ravens.

Oakland Raiders
On November 19, 2015, Ross was signed to the Oakland Raiders' practice squad. On November 25, 2015, Ross was signed to the active roster.

New York Jets
Ross signed with the New York Jets on April 6, 2016. On September 3, 2016, he was released by the Jets. He was re-signed on September 29, 2016. He was released on October 11, 2016. He was re-signed by the Jets on November 22, 2016. He was released again on December 6, 2016.

Arizona Cardinals
On December 14, 2016, Ross was signed by the Cardinals. In two games with the Cardinals, Ross caught 4 passes for 37 yards, including one touchdown. It was his first touchdown since September 28, 2014 over two years earlier when Ross scored as a member of the Lions against the Jets.

On February 27, 2017, Ross signed a one-year contract extension with the Cardinals. He was released on September 2, 2017.

References

External links
California Golden Bears bio
Detroit Lions bio
Indianapolis Colts bio
New England Patriots bio
ESPN Player Stats

1988 births
Living people
Players of American football from Sacramento, California
American football wide receivers
American football return specialists
California Golden Bears football players
New England Patriots players
Indianapolis Colts players
Green Bay Packers players
Detroit Lions players
Baltimore Ravens players
Oakland Raiders players
New York Jets players
Arizona Cardinals players